At Ground Zero is a 1993 Independent feature film (released in 1994) directed and written by Craig Schlattman from an original story. It stars Thomas Jane (credited as Tom Elliott), and his then wife, Aysha Hauer (Rutger Hauer's daughter), as a couple on the run across America to find 'home'. Also featured in the film are Brian Brophy as Carman, and Schlattman as Bubba. After receiving critical praise in the European and American press, At Ground Zero was given no advertising and a small release by a minor distributor, Filmopolis Pictures. It has since gone on to be an Indie favorite.

Plot 

Tom and Aysha (character names) are at the economic bottom of the LA scene; no money, on drugs, and selling themselves to exist. Tom brains his drug dealer, steals his drugs and the two split town by bus and thumb, heading 'home'. Hitching a ride from a quixotic, dangerous character, Bubba, they put up with his advances until he too is ejected from his own car as the two free themselves from all restraint. Aysha starts a real spiral into heroin, as Tom joins in, but spirits are high. They run into a hilarious character, Carman, who they enlist in their fun, as the trip escalates into the threesomes' investigation of freedom, drugs, and abandonment. Carman leaves the duo, and Aysha falls into a drug appetite Tom can't understand and in frustration he hurts her. Together, but separate, they endure the car ride as they head for Minneapolis and home. In the end, the couples explore the detritus of their family, and lives, and even in betrayal have passion for each other. On a final, bittersweet note, Carman continues his self-destructive ways, as some hope endures.

Cast 

 Thomas Jane (credited as Tom Elliott) as Thomas Quinton Pennington
 Aysha Hauer as Aysha Almouth
 Brian Brophy Carman
 Craig Schlattman as Bubba

Analysis 

At Ground Zero explores an American culture peculiar to our contemporary world. It follows an alienated couple as they run across America, the characters they become involved with, and the ultimate disintegration of their relationship. Its gritty, contemporary feel, dark humor, uncompromising realism and visual strength evoke a metaphysical, surreal tone. At its heart this is a driven, existential love story in which the audience spends some time with 'fringe' characters, normally shunned by society. It has been compared, visually, to Michelangelo Antonioni's films, and has been called a contemporary Easy Rider.

Production 

At Ground Zero was written as an original story by Craig Schlattman, who, at the time, was making short films, documentaries, and still photographs while looking for financing for this film. Tired of waiting, and turned down by every studio he approached, he ran into Thomas Jane and Aysha Hauer while shooting a scene from Hiroshima Mon Amour for another director in which Tom and Aysha were the leads. Craig has said he knew they were perfect for the parts and approached them about being in the film by handing them scripts. A day later he got enthusiastic calls from Tom and Aysha excited to do the parts and be in the film. Craig has acknowledged that he was exploring aspects of his own character in the two leads, and saw in Tom and Aysha a chance for them to use their own experiences in the central love story, and changed the names of the leads, slightly, to let Tom and Aysha use their own names as tools for character. Unable to cast the quirky part of Carman, at the last minute Craig went to Brian Brophy's LA apartment and let him read for the part. Craig cast him on the spot and they prepared to go on the road in the next couple of days.

The movie was shot on the road from Los Angeles to Corpus Christi where part of the cast and all of the crew returned to LA. Tom and Aysha then proceeded to Minneapolis with Craig as director and crew, where the culminating scenes were shot. On the return to LA they grabbed scenes and stole locations along the way. At Ground Zero is a fine example of guerrilla filmmaking at its best. Barely any production budget, some credit cards, a car, some gas, and a desire to finish the film is what motivated everyone. Cast and crew of At Ground Zero were handed the script and asked to make their decision to work on the film based on their reaction to the script, and a realistic understanding of the 'budget' they had to work with. Craig has said the edgy, documentary, direct cinema feel of this film was intentional, and pushed as far as possible considering the budget available. All the actors were given great leeway with the script and encouraged to use their improvisational skills to expand the characters, keep the energy high, and heighten the 'realistic' tone of this story. Craig has said the production technique of using the ups and downs and emotional swings of being with 'strangers' for a month on the road was a conscious decision to expand the emotional swings of the lead characters and their disintegrating relationship, and was helpful for the actors as the story, and everyone's patience, headed for the culminating scenes.

Reception 

At Ground Zero premiered at the Rotterdam International Film Festival to enthusiastic, full houses, and went on an extensive festival run in the US and Europe, garnering very positive reviews along the way –

External links 
 At Ground Zero at the Internet Movie Database
 At Ground Zero – official film website
 Proletariat Pictures – production company official website

1994 films
American crime comedy-drama films
1990s English-language films
1990s American films